The BMW N20 is a  turbocharged four-cylinder DOHC petrol engine with variable valve lift and variable valve timing which replaced the N53 (or BMW N52 in some markets) and was produced from 2011 to 2017 by BMW. Although the N20 is a four-cylinder engine, it is considered a replacement for the naturally aspirated six-cylinder N52/N53 because it powers equivalent models, producing similar horsepower to the N52/N53 with greater low-rpm torque and better efficiency.

The N20 features a twin-scroll turbocharger, double-VANOS (variable valve timing), Valvetronic (variable valve lift), direct injection, automatic stop-start and an electric water pump. The N20 was sold alongside the smaller displacement BMW N13 turbocharged four-cylinder engine. The N20 was placed in Wards Top 10 Engines in 2012.

In 2014, the N20 began to be replaced by its successor, the BMW B48.

Class action lawsuit alleging timing chain guide failures 
It has been well documented in online forums, that thousands of early production N20 engines were manufactured with faulty internal plastic timing chain guides. Evidence indicates that defective polycarbonate compositions were utilized in the manufacturing process for the timing chain guide, and as a result over a very short period of time the rigid plastic guides would break down and deteriorate in the engine with little or no warning. Upon failure of these internal plastic components, the timing chain slackens (becomes loose) and "skips time" by jumping teeth on upper cam shaft sprocket, a phenomenon that causes catastrophic damage to the engine by changing the piston-to-valve synchronization and causing these parts to contact each other.

In 2017, a class action lawsuit was filed by several owners against BMW seeking redress for the faulty units. Plaintiffs in the BMW engine defect class action seek to represent a nationwide Class of consumers affected by timing chain guide and secondary chain failure and wear as well as several subclasses for states such as New Jersey, Illinois, Florida, Utah, New York, Colorado, Texas, Alabama, Oklahoma, Massachusetts, California, Wisconsin, Oregon and North Carolina. In 2018 BMW attempted to dismiss the class action lawsuit. In 2019 U.S. District Judge William H. Walls partially granted and partially denied BMW's motion to dismiss claims that it sold vehicles with a known engine defect. Walls also ruled that the automaker cannot escape the suit entirely.

Models

N20B16
Applications:

125 kW version
 2013–2016 F10 520i (Turkey and Tunisia only)

N20B20
Applications:

115 kW version
 2013-2016 E89 Z4 sDrive18i
 2013-2017 F25 X3 sDrive18i
135 kW version
 2011–2015 E84 X1 xDrive/sDrive20i
 2011–2017 F25 X3 xDrive20i
 2012–2015 F30 320i
 2013–2016 F34 320i GT
 2014–2016 F32 420i
 2011–2016 F10 520i
 2013-2016 F10 520Li
 2011–2016 E89 Z4 sDrive20i
 2014–2016 F22 220i
 2015-2017 Brilliance Huasong 7 MPV
160 kW version
 2012–2017 F20 125i
 2013–2016 F10 525Li
 2015-2017 Brilliance Huasong 7 MPV 
180 kW version
 2011–2016 E89 Z4 sDrive28i
 2011–2015 E84 X1 xDrive/sDrive28i
 2012–2017 F25 X3 xDrive28i
 2011–2016 F30 328i
 2014-2016 F32 428i
 2012–2016 F10 528i
 2013–2016 F34 328i GT
 2014–2016 F22 228i
 2014–2017 F26 X4 xDrive28i
2016–2018 F15 X5 xDrive40e

See also
 BMW
 List of BMW engines

References

N20
Products introduced in 2011
Straight-four engines
Gasoline engines by model